Gorenje Vrhpolje is a settlement southwest of Šentjernej in southeastern Slovenia. The area is part of the traditional region of Lower Carniola. It is now included in the Southeast Slovenia Statistical Region.

Church
The local church, built south of the village, is dedicated to Saint Urban and belongs to the Parish of Šentjernej. It is mentioned in written documents dating to 1439, but owes its current Baroque style to a major rebuilding in the 18th century. Fragments of the medieval wall paintings are still visible on the exterior northern wall of the nave.

References

External links
Gorenje Vrhpolje on Geopedia

Populated places in the Municipality of Šentjernej